Jim Fitzpatrick may refer to:
Jim Fitzpatrick (actor) (born 1959), American actor
Jim Fitzpatrick (artist), Irish artist
Jim Fitzpatrick (athlete) (born 1959), American roller derby athlete, referee, artist, photographer and author
Jim Fitzpatrick (footballer) (1886–1960), Australian rules footballer
Jim Fitzpatrick (photographer) (fl. 1940s), Australian photographer for the Australian Information Service during WW2
Jim Fitzpatrick (politician) (born 1952), British politician
Jim Fitzpatrick (sound engineer), American sound engineer

See also 
 James Fitzpatrick (disambiguation)
 Fitzpatrick (surname)
 Fitzpatrick (disambiguation)